The Rugby Hall of Fame can refer to the Halls of Fame of the following sports:

Rugby league 
Rugby League Hall of Fame
Australian Rugby League Hall of Fame
British Rugby League Hall of Fame

Rugby union 
International Rugby Hall of Fame
IRB Hall of Fame
US Rugby Hall of Fame